Yafai is an Arabic-language surname. Notable people with the surname include:

 Galal Yafai(born 1992),is a British Olympic gold medallist amateur boxer, brother of Gamal and Khalid.
 Gamal Yafai (born 1991), English professional boxer, brother of Galal and Khalid
 Khalid Yafai (born 1989), British professional boxer, brother of Gamal and Galal

See also

References 

Arabic-language surnames